Einar Olsen (born 25 April 1936) is a Norwegian newspaper editor.

He was born in Kragerø. He was a journalist in the Norwegian News Agency from 1957 to 1960 and in the Labour Movement Press Office from 1960 to 1965. He then became editor-in-chief in Rogalands Avis from 1965 to 1970, Vestfold Arbeiderblad from 1971 to 1973 and Arbeiderbladet from 1974 to 1975. In 1989 he became the editor-in-chief of the Norwegian News Agency.

References

1936 births
Living people
Norwegian newspaper editors
People from Kragerø
Dagsavisen editors